Nagasaki is the capital city of Nagasaki Prefecture in Japan. 

Nagasaki may also refer to:

 Nagasaki Prefecture, Japan
 Atomic bombings of Hiroshima and Nagasaki during World War II
 Nagasaki (surname), a Japanese surname
 "Nagasaki" (song), a 1928 jazz song by Harry Warren and Mort Dixon
 Nagasaki (Schnittke), an oratorio composed by Alfred Schnittke
 Nagasaki: Memories of My Son, a 2015 Japanese film
 5790 Nagasaki, a main-belt asteroid

See also
 Kendo Nagasaki, a professional wrestling stage name